This is a List of Privy Counsellors of England and Great Britain appointed between the reorganisation of the Privy Council in 1679 and the death of Queen Anne in 1714.

Charles II, 1679–1685

1679
The Earl of Shaftesbury (1621–1683) (expelled 1679)
The Lord Finch (1621–1682)
The Earl of Anglesey (1614–1686)
The Duke of Albemarle (1653–1688)
The Duke of Monmouth (1649–1685)
The Marquess of Winchester (1624–1699)
The Earl of Arlington (1618–1685)
The Earl of Salisbury (1648–1683) (expelled 1681)
The Earl of Bridgewater (1623–1686)
The Earl of Sunderland (1679–1702) (expelled 1681; readmitted 1682)
The Earl of Essex (1631–1683)
The Earl of Bath (1628–1701)
The Viscount Halifax (1633–1695) (expelled 1685)
Hon. Henry Compton (1632–1713)
The Lord Robartes
Lord Russell (1639–1683)
Lord Cavendish (1641–1707)
Hon. Henry Coventry (1619–1686)
Sir Francis North (1637–1685)
Sir Henry Capel (1638–1696)
Sir John Ernle (1620–1697)
Sir Thomas Chicheley (1618–1699) (expelled 1687)
Sir William Temple, Bt (1628–1699)
Sir Edward Seymour, Bt (1633–1708)
Henry Powle (1630–1692)
William Sancroft (1617–1693)
The Duke of Lauderdale (1616–1682)
The Marquess of Worcester (1629–1699)
The Viscount Fauconberg (1628–1700)
The Duke of Newcastle (1630–1691)
The Lord Holles (1599–1680)
Hon. Laurence Hyde (1642–1711)

1680
Hon. Daniel Finch (1647–1730)
Sidney Godolphin (1645–1712)
Sir Leoline Jenkins (1623–1685)
The Earl of Ossory (1634–1680)
The Earl of Clarendon (1638–1709)
Sir Robert Carr, Bt (1637–1682)

1681
The Earl of Oxford (1626–1703)
The Earl of Chesterfield (1634–1714)
The Earl of Ailesbury (1638–1685)
The Earl of Conway (1623–1683)
The Earl of Craven (1606–1697)

1682
George Legge (1648–1691)
The Duke of Ormonde (1610–1688)
The Earl of Lindsey (1630–1701)
Sir Francis Pemberton (1625–1697)

1683
The Earl of Huntingdon (1650–1701)
The Earl of Peterborough (1624–1697)
Sir George Jeffreys (1648–1689)

1684
The Earl of Moray (1634–1701)
The Earl of Middleton (1650–1719)

1685
John Drummond (1650–1715)

James II, 1685–1688

Prince George of Denmark (1653–1708)
The Duke of Queensberry (1637–1695)
The Earl of Perth (1648–1716)
The Earl of Mulgrave (1648–1721)
The Earl of Berkeley (1628–1698)
Sir Edward Herbert (1648–1698)
The Viscount Preston (1648–1695)
The Earl of Plymouth (1627–1687)

1688
The Lord Crew (1633–1721)
The Earl of Powis (1617–1696)
The Lord Arundell of Wardour (1606–1694)
The Lord Belasyse (1614–1689)
The Lord Dover (1636–1708) (Earl of Dover in the Jacobite Peerage)
The Earl of Tyrconnell (1630–1691)
The Earl of Castlemaine (1634–1705)
The Duke of Hamilton (1635–1694)
Sir Nicholas Butler
Edward Petre (1631–1699)

1688
Silius Titus (1623–1704)

William III and Mary II, 1689–1702

1689
The Earl of Danby (1631–1712)
The Duke of Norfolk (1653–1701)
The Marquess of Winchester (1625–1699)
The Marquess of Halifax (1633–1695)
The Earl of Lindsey (1630–1701)
The Earl of Devonshire (1640–1707)
The Earl of Dorset (1638–1706)
The Earl of Oxford (1626–1703)
The Earl of Shrewsbury (1660–1718) (expelled 1692; re-admitted 1694)
The Earl of Bedford (1613–1700)
The Earl of Macclesfield (1618–1694)
The Viscount Fauconberg (1628–1700)
The Earl of Monmouth (1658–1735)
The Viscount Newport (1620–1708)
The Lord Lumley (1650–1721)
Hon. Henry Compton (1632–1713)
The Lord Montagu (1638–1709)
The Lord Delamere (1652–1694)
The Lord Churchill (1650–1722)
William Bentinck (1649–1709)
Hon. Henry Sydney (1641–1704)
Hon. Sir Robert Howard (1626–1698)
Sir Henry Capell (1637–1696)
Henry Powle (1630–1692)
Edward Russell (1653–1727)
Richard Hampden (1631–1695)
Hugh Boscawen (1625–1701)
Hon. Thomas Wharton (1648–1715)
Sir John Lowther, Bt (1655–1700)
Arthur Herbert (1647–1716)
William Harbord (1635–1692)
The Duke of Schomberg (1615–1690)
Sir John Holt (1642–1710)
The Earl of Pembroke (1656–1733)

1690
Sir Henry Goodricke, Bt (1642–1705)
The Marquess of Winchester (1661–1722)
The Lord Godolphin (1645–1712)

1691
Sir John Trevor (1637–1717)
The Earl of Bridgewater (1646–1701)
John Tillotson (1630–1694)

1692
The Earl of Rochester (1641–1711)
The Earl of Ranelagh (1636–1712)
The Lord Cornwallis (1655–1698)
Sir Edward Seymour, Bt (1633–1708)
The Viscount Falkland (1656–1694)
The Lord Lexinton (1661–1723)

1693
Sir John Somers (1651–1716)
Sir John Trenchard (1649–1695)
The Lord Coningsby (1657–1729) (expelled 1724)

1694
Viscount Dursley (1649–1710)
The Earl of Stamford (1654–1720)
Charles Montagu (1661–1715)

1695
Thomas Tenison (1636–1715)
Sir William Trumbull (1639–1716)
The Duke of Schomberg (1641–1719)
The Earl of Tankerville (d. 1701)
Hon. Peregrine Bertie (1663–1711)
John Smith (1655–1723)

1696
The Duke of Ormonde (1665–1745) (expelled 1715)
Sir Joseph Williamson (1633–1701)

1697
The Earl of Jersey (1656–1711)
James Vernon (1646–1727)

1698
The Earl of Manchester (1660–1722)

1699
The Lord Ferrers (1650–1717)

1700
Sir Nathan Wright (1654–1721)
Sir Charles Hedges (1650–1714)

1701
Hon. Henry Boyle (1669–1725)
The Earl of Lindsey (1660–1723)
The Earl of Carlisle (1669–1738)
The Duke of Somerset (1662–1748)

1702
The Earl of Radnor (1660–1723)
The Earl of Burlington (1660–1704)

Anne, 1702–1714

1702
The Marquess of Normanby (1648–1721)
The Earl of Abingdon (1672–1743)
Sir John Leveson-Gower, Bt (1675–1709)
John Grobham Howe (1657–1722)
The Earl of Nottingham (1647–1730)
The Earl of Northampton (1664–1727)
The Viscount Weymouth (1640–1714)
The Lord Dartmouth (1672–1750)
John Granville (1665–1707)
Sir Thomas Trevor (1658–1730)
Sir George Rooke (1650–1709)
The Lord Poulett (1663–1743)

1703
John Sharp (1645–1714)
The Earl of Thanet (1644–1729)
The Lord Guernsey (1649–1719)

1704
The Earl of Kent (1671–1740)
Robert Harley (1661–1724)
Thomas Mansell (1667–1723)

1705
The Duke of Newcastle (1662–1711)
The Earl of Peterborough (1658–1735)
The Lord Cholmondeley (1662–1724)
Thomas Erle (1650–1720)
William Cowper (1665–1723)

1706
The Earl of Derby (1664–1736)
The Earl of Sunderland (1675–1722)

1707
The Duke of Devonshire (1672–1729)

1708
The Marquess of Dorchester (1665–1726)
The Earl of Bindon (1670–1718)
The Earl of Mar (1675–1732)
The Viscount Townshend (1674–1738)
The Duke of Queensberry (1662–1711)
The Earl of Seafield (1664–1730)
The Duke of Montrose (1682–1742)
The Earl Rivers (1654–1712)
The Earl of Essex (1670–1709)
The Earl of Loudoun (d. 1731)
Thomas Coke (1674–1727)

1709
The Duke of Argyll (1680–1743)
The Duke of Roxburghe (1680–1741)
Sir John Holland, Bt (d. 1724)
The Earl of Orford (1653–1727)

1710
The Earl of Bradford (1644–1723)
Sir Thomas Parker (1666–1732) (expelled 1725)
Sir Richard Onslow (1654–1717)
The Earl of Anglesey (1676–1710)
Henry St John (1678–1751)
Sir Simon Harcourt (1661–1727)
Lord Hyde (1672–1753)
The Earl of Anglesey (1678–1737)
The Duke of Beaufort (1684–1714)

1711
The Earl of Orrery (1674–1731)
The Earl of Orkney (1670–1737)
The Marquess of Annandale (d. 1721)
The Earl of Winchilsea (1672–1712)
Robert Benson (1676–1731)
Hon. Henry Paget (1663–1743)
The Earl of Strafford (1672–1739)
William Bromley (1663–1732)
John Robinson (1650–1723)
The Earl of Clarendon (1661–1723)
The Earl of Islay (1659–1724)
The Lord North (1678–1734)

1712
The Duke of Atholl (1660–1724)
The Lord Lansdowne (1666–1735)
The Earl of Portmore (1656–1730)
Major-General John Hill (d. 1735)
The Lord Guilford (1673–1729)

1713
The Duke of Northumberland (1665–1716)
Sir John Stonehouse (c. 1672–1733)
Sir William Wyndham, Bt (1688–1740)

Government of England
1679